Ghalia Qabbani is a Syrian writer and journalist. She grew up in Kuwait, but was forced to leave after the Iraqi invasion in 1990.

She studied law at a university and graduated in 1979. She has worked as a journalist ever since, including stints at al-Watan (Kuwait) and al-Hayat (London). She moved to the United Kingdom in 1994.

Her books include several collections of short stories and novels. Her debut novel The Mirror of Summer appeared in 1998, followed by her second novel Secrets and Lies.

She served on the judging panel of the inaugural Arabic Booker Prize.

Currently, she lives in London.

References

Syrian women short story writers
Syrian short story writers
Syrian women novelists
Syrian novelists
Syrian journalists
Syrian women journalists
20th-century short story writers
20th-century novelists
20th-century journalists
21st-century short story writers
21st-century novelists
21st-century journalists
Syrian expatriates in the United Kingdom
Living people
20th-century Syrian women writers
20th-century Syrian writers
21st-century Syrian women writers
21st-century Syrian writers
Year of birth missing (living people)